Valdelsa or Val d'Elsa is the valley of the river Elsa, in Tuscany, central Italy. The valley is divided into two traditional regions: Alta Valdelsa ("Upper Valdelsa"), in the province of Siena, Poggibonsi being the largest town in the area; and Bassa Valdelsa, in the Metropolitan City of Florence, Empoli being the largest town (although technically the latter is in the Valdarno). Other centers in the valley include Castelfiorentino, Certaldo, Colle di Val d'Elsa and San Miniato.

The economy is now mostly based on high quality, small-quantity agricultural productions, and tourism.

History
The Valdelsa was a center of the Etruscan civilization, as shown by a wide range of findings in the area, including several necropolises. 

In the Middle Ages, it was crossed by the Via Francigena, a pilgrimage road connecting France and Northern Europe to Rome, and therefore saw an economic and religious development. There were numerous churches, convents and pleban churches, while its strategical role is testified by the presence of a series of towers and fortified boroughs, mostly from the 10th and 11th century, built by noble families such as the Alberti and the Cadolingi. The valley entered under the influence of the growing power of the Republic of Florence in the 13th-14th centuries. Under the Medici, the economic role of Valdelsa lost importance, since the rulers of Florence exploited it as a merely agricultural area.

References 

Elsa
Geographical, historical and cultural regions of Italy
Province of Siena
Metropolitan City of Florence